Metal Gear Solid: Philanthropy is a 2009 Italian non-profit fan made film series created by Hive Division, a team of Italian students and filmmakers. It is a film based on the highly successful Metal Gear video game series. It is written, directed and edited by Giacomo Talamini, a 27-year-old Italian student filmmaker who also stars in the movie as Solid Snake.

History 
Metal Gear Solid: Philanthropy was conceived in 2002 when Talamini and school friend Gianluca were playing Metal Gear Solid 2: Sons of Liberty. The game had a significant impact on the two and they decided to create a film based on the series. Using equipment they had lying around, they started work on what is now known as the Old Project. After two years, production came to a halt. They had released a trailer but interest in the project was dying.

In 2005, the group (who was then known as Shamrock Creations) met in Venice to discuss the direction of the project. They refocused their aim and renamed themselves Hive Division after Gianluca left the group. The new project was called the New Project. Recruiting almost 40 people, Hive Division continued work on the film and started shooting at different locations around Italy, until July 2008 when the building used in the final scene was demolished. In winter 2008, they found an alternate location and filming continued. In March 2009, filming was complete and post-processing began. Aoife Ní Fhearraigh, whose song "The Best is Yet to Come" was used for the Metal Gear Solid Soundtrack, came into the studio towards the end of production to offer her vocal talent for use in "Will There Be an End", the ending theme to the movie.

The movie features a number of Italian actors, and the script was dubbed by voice actors to recreate the game's iconic style of voice work (in particular, an imitation of David Hayter's Solid Snake).

Plot 
The movie is divided into three parts, the first part entitled "The Overnight Nation" is sixty-nine minutes long and follows Snake as he joins Philanthropy, an organization created in order to stop Metal Gears around the world. Snake (Giacomo Talamini) teams up with Elizabeth Laeken (Patrizia Liccardi) and Pierre Leclerc (Nicola Cecconi) as they attempt to find out what's really going on in "The Overnight Nation". The movie is set in 2007, taking place before or right after the first part of Metal Gear Solid 2: Sons of Liberty.

A quote from Hive Division states:

Philanthropy explores ideas such as genetics, which is a recurring theme in the Metal Gear series; memetics, the study of how culture, habits, and information evolve, expand, how it is used and abused.

Parts two and three were planned for a release in 2014, but due to licensing issues with Konami it was announced to be cancelled. The first twelve minutes of Part 2 are viewable on the network.

Cast

Starring 
 Giacomo Talamini as Solid Snake and Armstech PMC Trooper
 Patrizia Liccaridi as Elizabeth Laeken 
 Nicola Cecconi as Pierre Leclerc 
 Marco Saran as Harrison Bishop
 Giovanni Contessotto as Abraham Bishop
 Andrea Furlan as Vitalij
 Enrico Pasotti as Aran

Voice Acting  
 Philipp Sacramento as Solid Snake 
 Lucien Dodge as Pierre Leclerc and Harrison Bishop
 Laura Post as Elizabeth Laeken 
 Adam Behr as Abraham Bishop 
 Glenn X Govan as Vitalij
 William Martin as Otacon 
 Alessandro Schiassi as Russian Pilot
 Alberto Vazzola as Russian Pilot
 Jonathan Ealam as Newscaster

Post Production 

 Visual Effects Supervisor: Alessandro Schiassi
 3D Lead Artist: Alberto Vazzola
 Concept Artist: Lamberto Azzariti

Budget 
Metal Gear Solid: Philanthropy was funded entirely by Hive Division who invested almost €10,000 (£9,000 GBP/$13,000 USD) in the production. Most of this went towards obtaining equipment and props.

Reception 
PlayStation Official Magazine UK praised the CGI work and remarked at the locations of scenes within the movie while Destructoid.com claims the movie will be better than its Hollywood counterpart.
Game series' creator Hideo Kojima has stated that he has watched the movie and was moved by the love of the film makers towards Metal Gear Solid, commenting that it was very well made and he's anxious to watch the next part.
This stands in contrast to Konami's decision to decline the authorization of the sequel on licensing grounds.

Availability 
Released 27 September 2009 the movie is available as a free download from the website and is also available for online stream through Vimeo, an online video sharing website.

References

External links

Recent project: In Memoria

Metal Gear
Live-action films based on video games
Fan films
2009 science fiction films
2009 films
Italian science fiction films
Films set in 2007
Works based on Konami video games
2000s English-language films